The Remington Woodsmaster Model 740 is a semi-automatic rifle manufactured by Remington Arms between 1955 and 1959. The rifle had a 22-inch barrel and a four-round magazine. The original calibers were 30-06 and .308, but calibers .244 and .280 were made available subsequently. The blued metal barreled action was mounted in a walnut stock. This model was succeeded by the Remington Model 742 in 1960 and the Remington Model 7400 in 1980.

References 

Remington Arms firearms
Semi-automatic rifles of the United States